Crocidura grandiceps is a species of mammal in the family Soricidae. It is found in Benin, Ivory Coast, Ghana, Guinea, Liberia, Nigeria, and Togo. Its natural habitat is subtropical or tropical moist lowland forests. It is threatened by habitat loss due to agriculture and aquaculture as well as logging and wood harvesting. To increase habitat protection for the C. grandiceps, in-place land/water protection conservation actions are in place. The vernacular name large-headed shrew is sometimes applied to C. grandiceps but has also been used for the entire related genus Paracrocidura. The IUCN List categorizes the C. grandiceps as Near Threatened as of 2008.

An adult C. grandicep is smaller than the size of a human hand and are typically covered in light brown fur. These animals are omnivores as they will eat both plants as well as other animals. The diet of the C. grandicep consists of a variety of insects, bugs, spiders, beetles, worms, certain fungi and vegetables, and occasionally other small mammals.

Sources

Crocidura
Mammals described in 1983
Taxonomy articles created by Polbot